The Battle of Berlin was the final major campaign of the European Theatre of World War II, fought between the Wehrmacht of Nazi Germany and the Red Army of the Soviet Union.  It began with the Battle of the Seelow Heights on 16 April 1945 and concluded with the Battle in Berlin. 

Units are listed as they were deployed from North to South on 16 April.

Northern Sector

Third Panzer Army 
General of Panzer Hasso von Manteuffel

 Swinemunde Corps
 General of Infantry John Ansat
 2nd Naval Division
 402nd Naval Division
 522nd Grenadier Ausbildung Regiment Stab
 27/172 Füsilier Ausbildung Battalion Rostock
 94th Grenadier Ausbildung Battalion Rostock
 4/222 Grenadier Ausbildung Battalion Rostock
 48/374 Grenadier Ausbildung Battalion Neubrandenburg
 89/368 Grenadier Ausbildung Battalion Schwerin
 85th Hungarian Regiment Stab
 Hungarian infantry school Varpalota
 Brigade Kopp
 Alarm Regiment 4
 Alarm Regiment 5
 Stab Artillery Ausbildung Regiment 2 Schwerin
 257th Artillery Ausbildung Battalion
 12/32 Artillery Battalion
 38/2 Artillery Battalion Schwerin
 22nd Flak Ausbildung Battalion

 XXXII Corps 
 General of Infantry Friedrich-August Schack
 1st Panzerjägd Battalion 
 Combat group Voigt
 Volkssturm Battalion 244
 Volkssturm Battalion 26/50
 Volkssturm Battalion 26/52
 Volkssturm Battalion 26/62
 281st Infantry Division
 379th Regiment  (I. Battalion)
 1098th Regiment (I. & II. battalions)
 Battalion Creuz
 Volkssturm Battalion Hessen Nassau
 One Festung Alarm Battalion
 549th Volksgrenadier Division
 1097th Grenadier Regiment (I. & II. battalions)
 1099th Grenadier Regiment (I. & II. battalions)
 1549th Artillery Regiment (I. to IV. Battalions)
 Other units
 1549th Pioneer Battalion
 549th Replacement Battalion 
 549th Füsilier Battalion
 549th Panzerjäger Battalion (3 companies)
 929th Heeres Artillery Battalion (2 heavy batteries with 2 guns each)
 3rd Flak Regiment
 605th Heavy Flak Battalion (6 batteries)
 325th Heavy Flak Battalion (7 batteries)
 474th Heavy Flak Battalion (8./616 Flak Battalion - 10,5 cm x 8 guns)
 437th Heavy Flak Battalion (6 batteries)
 Regiment Pommern 4 (II. & III. battalions)
 Marine Alarm Battalion
 Recce battalion of the 4th SS Polizei Division
 one battalion of 5th Jäger Division
 one HJ Battalion
 Volkssturm Battalion 26/11
 Volkssturm Battalion 26/29
 Volkssturm Battalion 26/70
 Another battalion
 SS Latvian Feldersatz Depot
 SS Latvian Grenadier Regiment 1 (I.-IV. Battalions) - detached in Swinemünde
 SS Latvian Grenadier Regiment 2 (I.-IV. Battalions, IV. Battalion with only 72 men)
 SS Latvian Grenadier Regiment 3 (I.-III. Battalions)
 Fortress Stettin
 Grenadier Regiment 418 (I. & II. Battalions) from 281st Security Division
 281st Füsilier Battalion from 281st Security Division
 1st Fortress Infantry Regiment (I. & II. Battalion) former 43rd Fortress Regiment (with 1453rd & 1454th Fortress battalions)
 2nd Fortress Infantry Regiment (I. & II. Battalion) former 44th Fortress Regiment (with 1455th & 1457th Fortress battalions)
 3rd Fortress Infantry Regiment (I. & II. Battalion) former  Over & Roy Alarm battalions
 4th Fortress Infantry Regiment (I. & II. Battalion) former Benner & Laase Alarm battalions
 5th Fortress Infantry Regiment (I. & II. Battalion) former 1st Marine Infantry Battalion & Feldersatz Battalion + police company
 85th Fortress M.G. Battalion
 Stettin A Fortress M.G. Battalion
 Fortress Pioneer Battalion
 3132nd Artillery Regiment (II. (3., 4., 7., 8. batteries every one with 5 x 7,62 cm (Russian)) & III. (9.& 10. batteries every one with 4 x 15 cm & 11. & 12. batteries, every one with 6 x 7,62 cm (Russian)) battalions)
 3156th Fortress Flak Battalion (3147th (6 x 10,5 cm (French)) & 3148th ( 6 x 12,2 cm (Russian) Fortress Flak batteries) 
 3158th Fortress Flak Battalion (1., 2. & 3. Batteries every one with 4 x 15,2 cm (Russian))
 VIII Fortress Pak Regiment 
 XVI Fortress Pak Verband (comp. 4, 7, 8, 10)
 XXVII Fortress Pak Verband (comp. 1-6, 8 & 10)
 725th Pioneer Battalion (4 companies)
 555th z.v.B. Pioneer Regiment
 Fire security Battalion (3 companies)
 96th Pioneer Battalion (4 companies)
 254th Pioneer Battalion (3 companies)
 IV/ Waffen SS Grenadier Regiment (3 companies)

 Oder Corps 
 Obergruppenführer Erich von dem Bach-Zelewski
 Fs E. u. A. Regiment 1
 284th Sturmgeschütze Brigade
  Infantry Group Klossek 
 1604th (Russian) Regiment (2 battalions) 
 89/IV Hungarian Battalion 
 Volkssturm Battalion Genssen 
 one Battalion F.A. Oder 
 II./3 SS Regiment
 610th Infantry Division
 1. SS Police Brigade
 Volkssturm Battalion Hamburg
 Volkssturm Battalion Brandenburg
 Volkssturm Battalion

Second Belorussian Front
Marshal Konstantin Rokossovsky

Second Shock Army
Colonel General Ivan Fedyuninsky
 98th Rifle Corps
 142nd Rifle Division
 281st Rifle Division
 381st Rifle Division
 108th Rifle Corps
 46th Rifle Division
 90th Rifle Division
 372nd Rifle Division
 116th Rifle Corps
 86th Rifle Division
 321st Rifle Division
 326th Rifle Division
 161st Fortified Region
 8th Guards Tank Corps
 58th Guards Tank Brigade
 59th Guards Tank Brigade
 60th Guards Tank Brigade
 28th Guards Motorized Rifle Brigade

Sixty-Fifth Army
Colonel General Pavel Batov
 18th Rifle Corps
 15th Rifle Division
 37th Guards Rifle Division
 69th Rifle Division
 46th Rifle Corps
 108th Rifle Division
 186th Rifle Division
 413th Rifle Division
 105th Rifle Corps
 44th Guards Rifle Division
 193rd Rifle Division
 354th Rifle Division

Seventieth Army
Colonel General Vasily Popov
 47th Rifle Corps
 71st Rifle Division
 136th Rifle Division
 162nd Rifle Division
 96th Rifle Corps
 1st Rifle Division
 38th Guards Rifle Division
 165th Rifle Division
 114th Rifle Corps
 76th Guards Rifle Division
 160th Rifle Division
 300th Rifle Division

Forty-Ninth Army
Colonel General Ivan Grishin
 70th Rifle Corps
 139th Rifle Division
 238th Rifle Division
 121st Rifle Corps
 42nd Rifle Division
 199th Rifle Division
 380th Rifle Division

Nineteenth Army
Colonel General Vladimir Romanovsky
 40th Guards Rifle Corps
 10th Guards Rifle Division
 101st Guards Rifle Division
 102nd Guards Rifle Division
 132nd Rifle Corps
 18th Rifle Division
 27th Rifle Division
 313th Rifle Division
 134th Rifle Corps
 205th Rifle Division
 272nd Rifle Division
 310th Rifle Division
 3rd Artillery Corps
 1st Artillery Division
 18th Machine Gun Artillery Division

Fifth Guards Tank Army
Colonel General Vasily Volsky
 29th Tank Corps
 53rd Motorized Rifle Brigade
 25th Tank Brigade
 31st Tank Brigade
 32nd Tank Brigade

Front Reserve
 3rd Guards Cavalry Corps
 5th Guards Cavalry Division
 6th Guards Cavalry Division
 32nd Cavalry Division
 26th Artillery Division
 1st Guards Tank Corps
 1st Guards Motorized Rifle Brigade
 15th Guards Tank Brigade
 16th Guards Tank Brigade
 17th Guards Tank Brigade
 3rd Guards Tank Corps
 2nd Guards Motorized Rifle Brigade
 3rd Guards Tank Brigade
 18th Guards Tank Brigade
 19th Guards Tank Brigade
 8th Motorized Corps
 66th Motorized Rifle Brigade
 67th Motorized Rifle Brigade
 68th Motorized Rifle Brigade
 116th Tank Brigade

Center Sector

Army Group Vistula
Colonel General Gotthard Heinrici

Ninth Army
General of Infantry Theodor Busse
 Sturm Battalion AOK 
 Hitlerjugend Nahkampf Brigade (I. to IV. Battalions each w 4 companies).

 CI Corps
 General of Artillery Wilhelm Berlin
 406th Volks Artillery Corps (I. to V. Battalions II. & IV. each w 2 companies, the others w 3 companies)
 111th Sturmgeschutz Lehr Brigade 
 Parachute Panzerjägd Brigade "Pirat" (from 541st Volksgrenadier Division)
 15th Schweres werfer Regiment (II. Battalion (3 companies - each 6 x 15 cm))
 53rd Flak Regiment (336th Battalion - 7/751 (2 x 8,8 cm), 1/185 (4 x 10,5 cm), 4/336 (4 x 10,5 cm), 2/336 (4 x 10,5), RAD 3/785 (3 x 10,5 cm), 1/339 (6 x 8,8cm + 3 x 2cm), 1/876 (3 x 3,7 cm), RAR (6 x 3,7 cm), FKT (3 x 3,7 cm) 2/871 (15 x 3,7 cm))  I./13 Battalion - 8 companies, 402nd Battalion - 10 companies)
 182nd Flak Regiment (I./19 Battalion (3 companies 4 x 8,8 cm + 3 x 2 cm + 1 company 12 x 3,7 + 12 x 2 cm), I./54 Battalion (4 companies 4 x 8,8 cm + 3 x 2 cm + 1 company 12 x ? cm + 2 x 2 cm), leichte 87 Battalion (1 company 12 x 3,7 cm + 1 company 18 x 2 cm + 1 company ? x 2 cm )
 16/69 Volkssturm Battalion
 16/128 Volkssturm Battalion
 4 Volkssturm companies (16/75, 16/123, 16/511, 16/67/1)
 5th Jäger Division
 56th Jäger regiment
 75th Jäger regiment
 5th Jäger artillery regiment
 606th Division Stab z.b.V.
 Schatten Regiment A (I. & II. Battalions + 14. Company)
 Regiment Sator (battalions Bählkow, Gorny & Spandau)
 Regiment Rohrde (Battalion Potsdam & Alarm? Battalion 67)
 Police Landschützen Battalion Bremen (606th Füsilier Battalion? (3 companies))
 606th Artillery Regiment (III. (2 light batteries - each 4 guns & 1 heavy battery with 4 guns) & IV. (2 heavy batteries each with 6 guns + 1 heavy battery 5 x 15,2 (Russian guns))
 1606th Panzerjäger company (7 PaK 75 mm)

 3rd Panzer A. u. E. Battalion (3 companies - armored cars)
 309th Berlin Infantry Division
 Wachregiment GrossDeutschland (I. & II. Battalions + 13. & 14. companies)
 652nd Grenadier Regiment (I. & II. Battalions)
 653rd Grenadier Regiment (I. & II. Battalions)
 309th Artillery Regiment (I. (1-3 companies with 3,4 & 4 10,5 cm), I./301 (1-3 companies each 4 x 8,8 cm + 3 x 2 cm), III./707 (1-2 companies each 4 x 8,8 cm + 3 x 2 cm), IV./234 (10-11 & IV (bod) companies each 4 x 15 cm))
 309th Pioneer Battalion (3 companies (one of them motorised))
 309th Panzerjäger Battalion (3 companies - with 12 PaK 75mm & 10/8 ready StuG III) 
 1234th Fhj Regiment "Potsdam" (I. & II. Battalions)
 16./1129th PanzerJägd Battalion (from Kurmark Division) with 15/10 ready Jägpanzer 38.
 4 Volkssturm Battalion (Alarm battalions Brandenburg, 323rd Potsdam, Spandau, 338th z.b.V.) 
 25th Panzergrenadier Division
 5th Panzer Battalion
 35th Panzergrenadier Regiment (I. to III. Battalions)
 119th Panzergrenadier Regiment (I. (Half-tracks) & II. & III. Battalions)
 25th Pioneer Battalion (5 companies)
 25th Panzerjäger Battalion
 125th Reconnaissance Battalion
 292nd Heeres Flak Battalion
 25th Panzergrenadier Artillery Regiment (I. (3 batteries - every one with 5 x 10,5 cm), II. (3 batteries - with 5,6 & 5 guns x 10,5 cm & III. (1 battery 4 x 10,5 cm, 2 batteries 5 x 15 cm) Battalions)
 Kampfgruppe 1001 Nights

 LVI Panzer Corps
 General of Artillery Helmuth Weidling
 Heeres 920th StuG Lehr Brigade

 9th Fallschirmjäger Division
 25th Parachute Regiment (I. & III. Battalions)
 26th Parachute Regiment (I. & III. Battalions)
 9th Parachute Artillery Regiment (I. to III. Battalions)
 9th Parachute Rocket battalion (3 companies)
 9th Parachute Pioneer battalion (3 companies) 
 18th Panzergrenadier Division
 118th Panzer Battalion
 30th Panzergrenadier Regiment (mot) (I., II., III. Battalions)
 51st Panzergrenadier Regiment (mot)
 18th Artillery Regiment (mot) (I., II., III. Battalions)
 118th Reconnaissance Battalion 
 
 20th Panzergrenadier Division
 8th Panzer Battalion
 76th Panzergrenadier Regiment ( 3 battalions)
 90th Panzergrenadier Regiment ( 3 battalions)
 20th artillery regiment (3 battalions)

 Müncheberg Panzer Division
 Panzer Battalion Müncheberg (3 companies)
 1st Panzergrenadier Regiment Müncheberg (I. & II. Battalions)
 2nd Panzergrenadier Regiment Müncheberg (I. & II. Battalions)
 Panzerjäger company Müncheberg
 Panzerpioneer company Müncheberg
 Artillery Regiment Müncheberg (I. Battalion (3 companies each with 6 guns), II. (Flak Battalion) (2 batteries each 4 x 8,8 cm + 1 battery 4 x 3,7 cm))

 XI SS Panzer Corps
 Obergruppenführer Matthias Kleinheisterkamp
 404th Volksartillerie Corps 
 (I.(1-3 batteries), II.(4-6 batteries), III.(7-9 batteries), IV.(10-11 batteries), V.(12-13 batteries), VI.(14-16 batteries)
 1240th Fhj Regiment (I. & II. battalions)
 303rd ‘Döberitz’ Infantry Division
 300th Grenadier Regiment (I. & II. Battalions)
 301st Grenadier Regiment (I. & II. Battalions)
 302nd Grenadier Regiment (I. & II. Battalions)
 303rd Artillery Regiment (I. (1-3 companies each 4 x 10,5 cm), II. (4-6 companies ? x 10,5), III. (7-9 companies each 4 x 8,8 cm/before was I./216 LW - Luftwaffe)
 303rd Füsilier Battalion (3 companies)
 303rd Pioneer Battalion (3 companies)
 303rd Panzerjäger Battalion ( 3 companies - Stug III)
 169th Infantry Division (9 battalions)
 378th Grenadier Regiment (I. to III. Battalions)
 392nd Grenadier Regiment (I. to III. Battalions)
 1242nd Fhj Regiment (I. & II. Battalions + 13. & 14. companies)
 230th Pioneer Battalion
 230th Jagdpanzer Battalion (1. & 2. companies + 1230th Jägdpanzer company - 14 vehicles)
 230th Artillery Regiment (I. to IV Battalions)
 Festungs Pak Verband XXVI (6., 7. & 10. companies)
 712th Infantry Division
 Fhj Regiment 1239 (Wiener Neustadt) (I. & II. battalions)
 Fhj Regiment 1241 (Güstrow) (I. & II. battalions)
 Alarm Battalion Hauck
 108th Volkssturm Battalion 
 Schatten Regiment B (2 Battalions)
 1712th Artillery Regiment (III. (3 batteries? - each 3 x 10,5 cm?), IV. (2 batteries - each 6 x 15 cm))
 Kurmark Panzergrenadier Division
 Panzer Battalion Kurmark
 Panzergrenadier Regiment Kurmark (I. & II. Battalions)
 Artillery Battalion Kurmark (3 batteries, each with 4 guns)

 Frankfurt der Oder Garrison
 Generalmajor Ernst Biehler
 Festungs Grenadier Regiment 1
 Festungs Grenadier Regiment 2
 Festungs Grenadier Regiment 3
 Festungs Grenadier Regiment 4
 Festungs M.G. Battalion 84 (4 companies - 1 w. every Grenadier Regiment)
 Festungs KGr. 5 (Battalion size)
 Festungs KGr. 6 (Festungs infantry Battalion 1449 + 1 Police company)
 Festungs KGr. 7
 Festungs KGr. 8
 Festungs infantry Flak Battalion 829 (Part)
 Festungs Pionier Sperr Battalion 952
 Festungs PaK Verband XXVI (4 companies w. 39 8,8cm Pak43)
 Heavy Flak Battalion 185
 Heavy Flak Battalion 405
 Festungs Artillery Stab 1320
 Festungs Artillery Battalion 1325 (3 batteries)
 Festungs Artillery Battalion 1326 (4 batteries)
 Festungs Artillery Battalion 1327 (5 batteries - Before known w. number 3157)
 12 Tank towers 7,5 cm
 Panzer Jagd Battalion 2 (1 company)

 V SS Mountain Corps
 Obergruppenführer Friedrich Jeckeln
 408th Volksartillerie Brigade (I.(1-3 batteries), II.(4-5 batteries), III.(7-9 batteries), IV. (10-11 batteries), V. (13-14 batteries))
 15th SS Pz Jagd Company
 2nd Pz Jagd Battalion(without one company)
 561st SS Panzerjäger Battalion

 286th Infantry Division
 Regiment von Petersdorf (2 battalions)
 1237th Fhj Regiment (2 battalions)
 Alarm Battalion Brieskow
 27/151 Volkssturn Battalion "Dresden"
 7/108 Volkssturn Battalion "Mainfranken"
 Volkssturn Battalion Oberdonau
 verstärke Pionnier Battalion 275
 32nd SS Grenadier Division
 86th SS Grenadier Regiment (I. & II. Battalions)
 87th SS Grenadier Regiment (I. & II. Battalions)
 32nd SS Artillery Regiment (I. (2 batteries  10,5 cm x 4 guns), II. (2 batterie 10,5 cm x 4 guns), III. (1 battery 10,5 cm x 4 guns & 1 battery 15 cm x 4 guns)
 Volkssturm Battalion Thüringen
 391st Security Division
 1233rd Fhj Grenadier Regiment (I. to III. battalions - III. Battalion later became I./Grenadier Regiment Mueller z.b.V.)
 95th Grenadier Regiment (I. & II. battalions - before designed as 62nd & 63rd Alarm Battalions)
 239th Sicherungs Battalion (later became II./Grenadier Regiment Mueller z.b.V.)
 Pioneer Battalion (Stab + 1. & 2. companies) 
 SS Sturm Battalion z.v.B.
 8/16 Volkssturm Battalion 
 Rägener Division
 SS Verband Fhr Schüle Arolsen (I. to III. Battalions)
 Police Battalion Döring
 Absorbed the 286th Security Division
 Reserve
156th Infantry Division
1313th Grenadier Regiment (I. to III. Battalions)
1314th Grenadier Regiment (I. to III. Battalions)
1315th Grenadier Regiment (I. to III. Battalions)
1456th Artillery Regiment (I. Battalion (1.-3. batteries), II. (4.-6. batteries)
1456th Pioneer Battalion

First Belorussian Front
Marshal Georgy Zhukov

Sixty-First Army
Colonel General Pavel Belov
 9th Guards Rifle Corps
 75th Guards Rifle Division
 12th Rifle Division
 415th Rifle Division
 80th Rifle Corps
 212th Rifle Division
 234th Rifle Division
 356th Rifle Division
 89th Rifle Corps
 23rd Rifle Division
 311th Rifle Division
 397th Rifle Division

First Polish Army
Lieutenant General Stanislav Poplavsky
 Polish 1st Infantry Division
 Polish 2nd Infantry Division
 Polish 3rd Infantry Division
 Polish 4th Infantry Division
 Polish 6th Infantry Division
 Polish 1st Armoured Brigade

Forty-Seventh Army
Colonel General Franz Perkhorovich
 77th Rifle Corps
 185th Rifle Division
 260th Rifle Division
 328th Rifle Division
 125th Rifle Corps
 60th Rifle Division
 76th Rifle Division
 175th Rifle Division
 129th Rifle Corps
 82nd Rifle Division
 32nd Rifle Division
 143rd Rifle Division
 6th Breakthrough Artillery Division

Third Shock Army
Colonel General Vasily Kuznetsov
 7th Rifle Corps
 146th Rifle Division
 265th Rifle Division
 365th Rifle Division
 12th Guards Rifle Corps
 23rd Guards Rifle Division
 33rd Rifle Division
 52nd Guards Rifle Division
 79th Rifle Corps
 150th Rifle Division
 171st Rifle Division
 207th Rifle Division
 9th Tank Corps
 8th Motorized Rifle Brigade
 23rd Tank Brigade
 95th Tank Brigade
 108th Tank Brigade
 4th Breakthrough Artillery Corps
 5th Breakthrough Artillery Division

Fifth Shock Army
Colonel General Nikolai Berzarin
 9th Rifle Corps
 230th Rifle Division
 248th Rifle Division
 301st Rifle Division
 26th Guards Rifle Corps
 89th Guards Rifle Division
 94th Guards Rifle Division
 266th Rifle Division
 32nd Rifle Corps
 60th Guards Rifle Division
 295th Rifle Division
 416th Rifle Division
 5th Breakthrough Artillery Corps
 2nd Breakthrough Artillery Division
 14th Breakthrough Artillery Division
 11th Guards Heavy Tank Brigade
 67th Guards Heavy Tank Brigade

Eighth Guards Army
Colonel Generall Vasily Chuikov
 4th Guards Rifle Corps
 35th Guards Rifle Division
 47th Guards Rifle Division
 57th Guards Rifle Division
 28th Guards Rifle Corps
 39th Guards Rifle Division
 79th Guards Rifle Division
 88th Guards Rifle Division
 29th Guards Rifle Corps
 27th Guards Rifle Division
 74th Guards Rifle Division
 82nd Guards Rifle Division
 8th Breakthrough Artillery Corps
 18th Breakthrough Artillery Division
 29th Breakthrough Artillery Division
 7th Guards Heavy Tank Brigade

Sixty-Ninth Army
Colonel General Vladimir Kolpakchi
 25th Rifle Corps
 4th Rifle Division
 77th Guards Rifle Division
 61st Rifle Corps
 134th Rifle Division
 246th Rifle Division
 247th Rifle Division
 91st Rifle Corps
 41st Rifle Division
 312th Rifle Division
 370th Rifle Division

Thirty-Third Army
Colonel General Vyacheslav Tsvetayev
 16th Rifle Corps
 323rd Rifle Division
 339th Rifle Division
 383rd Rifle Division
 38th Rifle Corps
 52nd Rifle Division
 64th Rifle Division
 89th Rifle Division
 169th Rifle Division
 62nd Rifle Corps
 49th Rifle Division
 222nd Rifle Division
 362nd Rifle Division
 2nd Guards Cavalry Corps
 3rd Guards Cavalry Division
 4th Guards Cavalry Division
 17th Guards Cavalry Division

First Guards Tank Army
Colonel General Mikhail Katukov
 8th Guards Mechanized Corps
 19th Guards Mechanized Brigade
 20th Guards Mechanized Brigade
 21st Guards Mechanized Brigade
1st Guards Tank Brigade
 11th Guards Tank Corps
 27th Guards Mechanized Brigade
 40th Guards Tank Brigade
 44th Guards Tank Brigade
 45th Guards Tank Brigade
 11th Tank Corps
 12th Motorized Rifle Brigade
 20th Tank Brigade
 36th Tank Brigade
 65th Tank Brigade

Second Guards Tank Army
Colonel General Semyon Bogdanov
 1st Mechanized Corps
 19th Mechanized Brigade
 35th Mechanized Brigade
 37th Mechanized Brigade
 219th Tank Brigade
 9th Guards Tank Corps
 33rd Guards Mechanized Brigade
 47th Guards Tank Brigade
 50th Guards Tank Brigade
 65th Guards Tank Brigade
 12th Guards Tank Corps
 34th Guards Mechanized Brigade
 48th Guards Tank Brigade
 49th Guards Tank Brigade
 66th Guards Tank Brigade

Third Army
Colonel General Alexander Gorbatov
 35th Rifle Corps
 250th Rifle Division
 290th Rifle Division
 348th Rifle Division
 40th Rifle Corps
 5th Rifle Division
 129th Rifle Division
 41st Rifle Corps
 120th Rifle Division
 269th Rifle Division

Front Reserves
 2nd Guards Calvary Corps
 3rd Guards Calvary Division
 4th Guards Calvary Division
 17th Guards Calvary Division
 9th Tank Corps
 23rd Tank Brigade
 95th Tank Brigade
 108th Tank Brigade
 8th Motorized Brigade

Southern Sector

Army Group Centre
Feldmarshal Ferdinand Schörner

Fourth Panzer Army
General of Panzer Fritz-Hubert Gräser

(Later transferred to the 9th Army)
 V Corps
 General of Artillery Kurt Wäger
 35th SS Police Grenadier Division
 69th SS and Police Grenadier regiment
 70th SS and Police Grenadier regiment
 71st SS and Police Grenadier regiment
 35th SS and Police Füsilier battalion
 35th SS Artillery regiment
 29th SS Polizei-Schützen regiment
 30th SS Polizei Schutzen regiment
 Ausbildung Regiment 561
 Corps MG Battalion 95
 Alarm Regiment 94
 Alarm Regiment 97

 36th SS Grenadier Division
 Pz Jagd Battalion 4
 681st Heavy Antitank Battalion
 1244th Fj Regiment (I. & II. Battalion)
 72nd Waffen SS Grenadier regiment 
 73rd Waffen SS Grenadier regiment
 36th Füilier company
 36th SS artillery battalion
 Tank battalion Standort 1
 275th Infantry Division
 342nd Infantry Division
 21st Panzer Division

Twelfth Army
General of Panzer Walther Wenck
 XX Corps
 General of Cavalry Carl-Erik Koehler
 Theodor Körner RAD Infantry Division
 Ulrich von Hutten Infantry Division
 Ferdinand von Schill Infantry Division
 Scharnhorst Infantry Division
 XXXIX Panzer Corps
 Lt. General Karl Arndt
 12 – 21 April 1945 under OKW with the following structure:
 Clausewitz Panzer Division
 Schlageter RAD Division
 84th Infantry Division
 21 – 26 April 1945 under 12th Army with the following structure:
 Clausewitz Panzer Division
 84th Infantry Division
 324th 'Hamburg' Reserve Infantry Division
 588th Grenadier Regiment (I. & II. Battalions)
 589th Grenadier Regiment (I. & II. Battalions)
 324th Artillery Regiment (I. & II. Battalions)
 324th Füsilier Battalion
 'Meyer' Infantry Division
 XXXXI Panzer Corps 
 Lt. General Rudolf Holste
 Von Hake Infantry Division
 1st Von Hake Grenadier Regiment
 2nd Von Hake Grenadier Regiment
 199th Infantry Division
 V-Weapons Infantry Division
 901st z.b.V Artillery regiment (I. w. 1-3 comp, IV.? w. 10-11 comp.)
 XLVIII Panzer Corps
 General of Panzer Maximilian von Edelsheim
 14th Flak Division
90th Flak Regiment
 121st Heavy Flak Battalion
 568th Heavy Flak Battalion
 729th Light Flak Battalion
 43/IV Homeland Flak Battalion
120th Flak Regiment
 307th Heavy Flak Battalion
 323rd Heavy Flak Battalion
 357th Heavy Flak Battalion
 662nd Heavy Flak Battalion
 525th E heavy Flak Battalion
 80/XIII Homeland Flak Battalion
140th Flak Regiment
 432nd Heavy Flak Battalion
 722nd Light Flak Battalion
 728th Light Flak Battalion
 664th Lsp.Flak Battalion
 19th Sw. EA Flak Battalion
73rd Searchlight Regiment
 199th Searchlight Battalion
 258th Searchlight Battalion
 328th Searchlight Battalion
 367th Searchlight Battalion
 500th Searchlight Battalion
 510th Searchlight Battalion
134th Luftnachrichten Battalion
 Kampfgruppe Leipzig (Volkssturm Battalion Leipzig I. to VIII. and some flak batteries)
 Kampfgruppe Halle (8 Volkssturm battalions and 1 Ersatz battalion)

Berlin garrison 
9 defensive sectors created A to H and Z "Zentrum". Volkssturm battalions and 1st Flak Division'sbatteries were assigned to these sectors. Assignment of the batteries in Sector A to H is datedon 15th April.

 Wacht Regiment Berlin
 SS Wachbataillon Reichführer SS (600 men)

 Fortress regiments
 57th Fortress Regiment (3/115 VB + Wehrmacht Bat + Warnholz Police Bat) - Sector Anton
 58th Fortress Regiment
 59th Fortress Regiment - Sector Caesar
 60th Fortress Regiment (at least II.) - Sector Dora
 61st Fortress Regiment
 62nd Fortress Regiment (Outside Berlin with Kampgruppe Steiner)
 63rd Fortress Regiment
 64th Fortress Regiment
 65th Fortress Regiment

 1st Flak Division
 126th Flak Regiment (Nord)
 202nd Heavy Flak Battalion
 530th Heavy Flak Battalion
 5./437 (5 x 10,5cm) Dahlem Staats
 7./437 (5 x 10,5cm) Eichkamp
 9./212 (6 ital.) Trabrennd Ruhleben
 4./605 (6) Grunewald
 4./126 (5 x 10.5cm) Ruhleben
 2./422 (8 ital.) Jungfernheide
 3./211 (6) Blumeshof
 3./126 (6 x 10,5cm) Tegel: Schiesspl.
 2./215 v (4 x 41) Dreipfuhl
 3./215 v (3 x 10,5cm) Sven-Hedin Strasse
 123rd Heavy Flak Battalion (Turm)
 1./123rd battery (4 x 12,8cm) Friedrichshain
 2./123rd battery (4 x 12,8cm) Zoo
 3. 123rd Battery (3 x 12,8cm) Humbolthain
 733rd Light Flak Battalion
 z.b.V. 6524 battery (6 x 3,7cm + 3 x 20 mm) Flh Brandenburg Briest
 7./733 battery (12 x 3,7cm? + 3 x 20mm?) Flh Brandenburg Briest
 1./755 battery (3 x 3,7cm + 12 x 20 mm?) Sector H
 22nd Flak Regiment (Süd)
 422nd Heavy Flak Battalion (List of batteries)
 7./326 (ital.) in Hospital Schöneweide
 9./326 in Zentralviehof
 z.b.V. 10306 (RAD 4/174) in Laubenkolonie Weissensee
 2./605 in Karlshorst, Pionierschule
 5./326 in Trainierbahn Karlshorst
 4./307 in Friedrichsfelde-Ost
 6./126 (6 x 10,5 cm) in Hohenschönhausen II
 7./126 (5 x 10,5 cm) in Friesdrichsfelde I
 10./126 (6 x 10,5 cm) in Biesdorf 

 126th Heavy Flak Battalion
 4./422 in Oberspree
 5./126 (6 x 10,5 cm) in Schöneberg
 10./326 in Treptower Park II
 8./211 (RAD 4./145) in Stellung Treptower Park II
 z.b.V. 10359 in Sportplatz Baumschulenweg
 3./458 (4 x ?) in Tempelhofer Feld
 2./326 (RAD 3./52) in Stellung Bosporusweg
 5./211 (8 x ?) in Johannifer Stift 
 7./605 in Gradestrasse
 6./307 (RAD 7./95) in Sportplatz Grenzallee

 979th Light Flak Battalion
 z.b.V. 14040 Battery (3 x 3,7cm 43 + 3 x 3,7cm) Sector C
 z.b.V. 6524 Battery (3 x 3,7cm?) Sector C
 1./733 Battery (15 x 3,7cm ZW) Schönefeld

 Sector Caesar
in construction
 z.B.V. 10234 in Hospital Oberschöneweide
 z.b.V. 10224 in Spertplatz Herzberge
 233/III in Biesdorf I

 Sector Dora
 5./126 in Schöneberg
 5./211 in Sportplatz Lichterfelde

Volkssturm Battalions 

 Volkssturm battalions
 3/2 Volkssturm Battalion
 3/3 Volkssturm Battalion
 3/9 Volkssturm Battalion - Sector C
 3/11 Volkssturm Battalion - Sector C
 3/19 Volkssturm Battalion - Sector C
 3/21 Volkssturm Battalion 
 3/24 Volkssturm Battalion
 3/30 Volkssturm Battalion
 3/36 Volkssturm Battalion
 3/101 Volkssturm Battalion - Sector F
 3/105 Volkssturm Battalion - Sector F
 3/107 Volkssturm Battalion
 3/109 Volkssturm Battalion - Sector F
 3/110 Volkssturm Battalion
 3/111 Volkssturm Battalion - Sector E
 3/112 Volkssturm Battalion - Sector E
 3/113 Volkssturm Battalion - Sector F
 3/115 "Siemensdorf" Volkssturm Battalion - Sector A 
 3/119 Volkssturm Battalion
 3/121 Volkssturm Battalion - Sector A 
 3/155 Volkssturm Battalion
 3/164 Volkssturm Battalion
 3/181 Volkssturm Battalion - Sector F
 3/185 Volkssturm Battalion
 3/191 Volkssturm Battalion
 3/201 Volkssturm Battalion - Sector E
 3/203 Volkssturm Battalion - Sector E
 3/205 Volkssturm Battalion - Sector E
 3/208 Volkssturm Battalion
 16/209 Volkssturm Battalion
 209 Volkssturm Battalion - Sector E
 3/215 Volkssturm Battalion - Sector E
 3/216 Volkssturm Battalion
 268 Volkssturm Battalion
 3/277 Volkssturm Battalion
 3/301 Volkssturm Battalion
 3/303 Volkssturm Battalion - Sector D
 3/305 Volkssturm Battalion (Fought in February east of the Oder)
 3/306 Volkssturm Battalion - Sector D
 3/307 Volkssturm Battalion - Sector D
 3/309 Volkssturm Battalion - Sector C
 3/311 Volkssturm Battalion
 3/312 Volkssturm Battalion
 3/313 Volkssturm Battalion
 3/314 Volkssturm Battalion
 3/316 Volkssturm Battalion - Sector D
 3/320 Hitlerjugend Volkssturm Battalion
 3/355 Volkssturm Battalion
 3/403 Volkssturm Battalion - Sector G
 3/405 Volkssturm Battalion
 3/407 Volkssturm Battalion - Sector G
 3/421 Volkssturm Battalion - Sector G
 3/424 Volkssturm Battalion
 3/425 Volkssturm Battalion - Sector E
 3/427 Volkssturm Battalion
 3/511 Volkssturm Battalion - Sector C
 3/513 Volkssturm Battalion
 3/515 Volkssturm Battalion
 3/517 Volkssturm Battalion - Sector C
 3/521 Volkssturm Battalion - Sector C
 3/550 Volkssturm Battalion
 3/556 Volkssturm Battalion
 3/569 Volkssturm Battalion - Sector G
 3/603 Volkssturm Battalion - Sector G
 3/607 Volkssturm Battalion - Sector F
 3/609 Volkssturm Battalion - Sector F
 3/611 Volkssturm Battalion - Sector G
 3/615 Volkssturm Battalion (Fought in February east of the Oder)
 3/617 Volkssturm Battalion - Sector G
 3/628 Volkssturm Battalion
 3/691 Volkssturm Battalion - Sector A
 3/707 Volkssturm Battalion (Fought in February east of the Oder)
 3/709 Volkssturm Battalion (Fought in February east of the Oder)
 3/713 Volkssturm Battalion - Sector H
 3/715 Volkssturm Battalion - Treptow (Fought in February east of the Oder)
 3/725 Volkssturm Battalion - 
 3/803 Volkssturm Battalion - Sector H
 3/804 Volkssturm Battalion - Sector A
 3/805 Volkssturm Battalion - Sector A
 3/806 Volkssturm Battalion - Sector A
 3/811 Volkssturm Battalion
 3/812 Volkssturm Battalion - Sector A
 3/813 Volkssturm Battalion "Hummel" - Sector A
 3/815 Volkssturm Battalion - Sector A
 3/817 Volkssturm Battalion - Sector A
 ·/869 Volkssturm Battalion - Sector H
 3/885 Volkssturm Battalion - Sector A
 mot 3/891 Volkssturm Battalion - Sector A
 mot 3/892 Volkssturm Battalion - Sector A
 mot 3/894 Volkssturm Battalion - Sector A
 3/909 Volkssturm Battalion - Sector B
 3/917 Volkssturm Battalion - Sector B?
 3/919 Volkssturm Battalion - Sector B
 3/921 Volkssturm Battalion - Treptow
 3/922 Volkssturm Battalion - Treptow

 Volkssturm company Reichkanzeil - Sector Z

 10 "nominal" Volkssturm Pionier Battalions with 2.019 men
 Abschnitt A 3 companies - 364 men
 Abschnitt B 1 company - 152 men
 Anschnitt C 1 company - 160 men
 Abschnitt D 1 company - 130 men
 Abschnitt E 4 companies - 366 men
 Abschnitt F 1 company - 143 men
 Abschnitt G 3 companies - 256 men
 Abschnitt H 1 company - 169 men
 Abschnitt Z 1 company - 205 men
 Reserve 1 company - 64 men 

 And:
 Landeschutzen Battalion 320 - Sector A
 213th Sicherungs Battalion
 Festungs PAK Ausbildungs- und Ersatz Einheit 101 (1. to 5. companies)
 Festungs PAK Verband XXI (1. & 2. companies - at least)

Reinforcements directed to Berlin

 57th French SS Battalion "Fenet" from the 33rd SS Grenadier Division
 15th SS Füsilier Battalion from the 15th SS Latvian Division

Levies during the battle
 Kampfgruppe Moltke (1 Begleit esquadron, 1 panzer comp. "Kummersdorf" w. 12 tanks, 1 panzerjäger comp. "Dresden" w. 6 guns and 250 soldiers) formed in Zossen on 19th April.
 16/272 Volkssturm Battalion - Created on 19/04/45 in Velten (3 comp. w. 250 men)

First Ukrainian Front
Marshal Ivan Konev

Third Guards Army
Colonel General Vasily Gordov
 21st Rifle Corps
 58th Rifle Division
 253rd Rifle Division
 329th Rifle Division
 76th Rifle Corps
 106th Rifle Division
 187th Rifle Division
 120th Rifle Corps
 127th Rifle Division
 149th Rifle Division 
 197th Rifle Division
 25th Tank Corps
 20th Motorized Rifle Brigade
 111th Tank Brigade
 162nd Tank Brigade
 175th Tank Brigade

Thirteenth Army
Colonel General Nikolay Pukhov
24th Rifle Corps
 121st Guards Rifle Division
 395th Rifle Division
 27th Rifle Corps
 6th Guards Rifle Division
 280th Rifle Division
 350th Rifle Division
 102nd Rifle Corps
 117th Guards Rifle Division
 147th Rifle Division
 172nd Rifle Division
 1st Guards Artillery Division

Fifth Guards Army
Colonel General Alexey Zhadov
 32nd Guards Rifle Corps
 13th Guards Rifle Division
 95th Guards Rifle Division
 97th Guards Rifle Division
 33rd Guards Rifle Corps
 9th Guards Airborne Division
 78th Guards Rifle Division
 118th Rifle Division
 34th Guards Rifle Corps
 14th Guards Rifle Division
 15th Guards Rifle Division
 58th Guards Rifle Division
 3rd Artillery Division
 4th Guards Tank Corps
 3rd Guards Motorized Rifle Brigade
 12th Guards Tank Brigade
 13th Guards Tank Brigade
 14th Guards Tank Brigade

2nd Polish Army
Lt General Karol Świerczewski
Polish 5th Infantry Division
Polish 7th Infantry Division
Polish 8th Infantry Division
Polish 9th Infantry Division
Polish 10th Infantry Division
Polish 1st Armored Corps

Fifty-Second Army
Colonel General Konstantin Koroteyev
 48th Rifle Corps
 116th Rifle Division
 294th Rifle Division
 73rd Rifle Corps
 50th Rifle Division
 111th Rifle Division
 254th Rifle Division
 78th Rifle Corps
 31st Rifle Division
 214th Rifle Division
 373rd Rifle Division
 7th Guards Mechanised Corps
 24th Guards Mechanized Brigade
 25th Guards Mechanized Brigade
 26th Guards Mechanized Brigade
 57th Guards Tank Brigade

Third Guards Tank Army
Colonel General Pavel Rybalko
 9th Mechanized Corps
 69th Mechanized Brigade
 70th Mechanized Brigade
 71st Mechanized Brigade
 91st Tank Brigade
 6th Guards Tank Corps
 22nd Guards Motorized Rifle Brigade
 51st Guards Tank Brigade
 52nd Guards Tank Brigade
 53rd Guards Tank Brigade
 7th Guards Tank Corps
 23rd Guards Motorized Rifle Brigade
 54th Guards Tank Brigade
 55th Guards Tank Brigade
 56th Guards Tank Brigade
 4th Breakthrough Artillery Division

Fourth Guards Tank Army
Colonel General Dmitry Lelyushenko
 5th Guards Mechanized Corps
 10th Guards Mechanized Brigade
 11th Guards Mechanized Brigade
 12th Guards Mechanized Brigade
 24th Guards Tank Brigade
 6th Guards Mechanized Corps
 16th Guards Mechanized Brigade
 17th Guards Mechanized Brigade
 35th Guards Mechanized Brigade
 10th Guards Tank Corps
 29th Guards Motorized Rifle Brigade
 61st Guards Tank Brigade
 62nd Guards Tank Brigade
 63rd Guards Tank Brigade

Twenty-Eighth Army
Colonel General Alexander Luchinsky
20th Rifle Corps
20th Rifle Division
48th Guards Rifle Division
55th Guards Rifle Division
38th Guards Rifle Corps
50th Guards Rifle Division
54th Guards Rifle Division
96th Guards Rifle Division
 128th Rifle Corps
 61st Rifle Division
 130th Rifle Division
 152nd Rifle Division

Thirty-First Army
Lieutenant General Pyotr Shafranov
 71st Rifle Corps
 54th Rifle Division
 88th Rifle Division
 331st Rifle Division
 44th Rifle Corps
 62nd Rifle Division
 174th Rifle Division
 220th Rifle Division
 36th Rifle Corps
 352nd Rifle Division
 173rd Rifle Division
 176th Rifle Division

1st Guards Cavalry Corps
 Lieutenant General Viktor Kirillovich Baranov
 1st Guards Cavalry Division
 2nd Guards Cavalry Division
 7th Guards Cavalry Division

German Army Group Reserve 
 III SS Panzer Corps
 Obergruppenführer Felix Steiner
 Units later allocated to Ninth Army:
 503rd SS Heavy Panzer Battalion
 11th SS Panzergrenadier Division
 11th SS Panzer Regiment "Hermann von Salza" (I. & II. Battalions)
 23rd SS Grenadier Regiment (II. & III. Battalions)
 24th SS Grenadier Regiment (II. & III. Battalions)
 11th SS Artillery Regiment (I. to III. Battalions)
 11th SS Panzer Recce Battalion (3 companies)
 11th SS Pioneer Battalion
 23rd SS Panzergrenadier Division
 48th SS Volunteer Grenadier Regiment (I. & II. Battalions)
 49th SS Volunteer Grenadier Regiment (I. & II. Battalions)
 54th SS Volunteer Artillery Regiment (I. to III. Battalions)
 Units later allocated to Third Panzer Army:
 27th SS Grenadier Division
 66th SS Volunteer Grenadier Regiment (I. & II. Battalions)
 67th SS Volunteer Grenadier Regiment (I. & II. Battalions)
 27th SS Volunteer Artillery Regiment (I. to IV. Battalions)
 28th SS Grenadier Division
 69th SS Volunteer Grenadier Regiment (I. & II. Battalions)
 70th SS Volunteer Grenadier Regiment (I. & II. Battalions)
 28th SS Volunteer Artillery Regiment (I. to IV. Battalions)
 28th SS Volunteer Pioneer Battalion

See also
 Order of battle for the battle in Berlin
 Soviet Air Forces order of battle 1 May 1945

Notes

References

Bibliography

Archives 
 German archives in the Russian Federation: F. 500 op. 12452 d. 289 Dokumente und Materialien der Luftabwehr von Berlin im Mai 1945. Anfrage einer Flakeinheit über die notwendige Zahl der Volkssturmkräfte.

World War II orders of battle
Battle of Berlin